Burraneer is a bayside suburb in southern Sydney, in the state of New South Wales, Australia. Burraneer is 26 kilometres south of the Sydney central business district, in the local government area of the Sutherland Shire.

Burraneer sits on the peninsula of Burraneer Point, on the north shore of the Port Hacking estuary. Burraneer Bay forms the western border and Gunnamatta Bay the eastern border. Woolooware is the only adjacent suburb. Cronulla is located across Gunnamatta Bay. The suburbs of Dolans Bay, Port Hacking and Caringbah South are located across Burraneer Bay. The villages of Maianbar and Bundeena are located on the opposite bank of Port Hacking. Burraneer is a mostly residential suburb comprising predominantly large family homes with some offering expansive water views of the Port Hacking.

History

The name Burraneer Bay was recorded by surveyor Robert Dixon in 1827 as Burranear Bay, who chose many Aboriginal names for many of the bays in the area. It is popularly believed to mean point of the bay, probably due to an over-reading of an 1890 report by Richard Hill.
,
In 1858 Mary and Andrew Webster paid 108 pounds and 15 shillings plus a yearly peppercorn quit rent for their land here. The Websters sold their land to Dominick Dolan in 1863. In 1866, he sold his land to Thomas Holt (1811-1888), who added it to his huge  estate that stretched from Sutherland to Cronulla.

Commercial area

A group of shops and cafes are located on Woolooware Road, between Dominic St and Cross St. 
Another smaller group of shops is located nearby on Burraneer Bay Road, on the corner of Gannons Rd, opposite Burraneer Bay Public School.

The Royal Motor Yacht Club is located on Gunnamatta Bay.
The Burraneer Bay Marina is located on Burraneer Bay.
The Burraneer Family Practice is located at the corner of Woolooware and Burraneer Bay Roads. There is a petrol station and mechanic located directly across the road, however this falls into the suburb of Woolooware.

Demographics
According to the 2016 census of Population, there were 3,584 residents in Burraneer.

 83.7% of people were born in Australia. The most common other countries of birth were England 3.1%, New Zealand 1.5%, Italy 0.7%, United States of America 0.6%, and Singapore 0.4%.
 89.1% of people spoke only English at home.
 The most common responses for religion in Burraneer were Catholic 34.8%, Anglican 23.7%, No Religion 19.9%, Eastern Orthodox 4.1% and 6.9% did not state a religion.
 The average weekly household income in Burraneer was $2,860, a substantially significant inflation of 42% in comparison to the New South Wales average of $1,486.

Transport 
The closest railway station to Burraneer is Woolooware railway station, a station on the Cronulla branch line of the Sydney Trains Eastern Suburbs & Illawarra Line, or the T4 line. The station, like all NSW train stations, is opal active. All services are double deck electric trains of eight carriages traveling to Bondi Junction, stopping at major interchange stations such as Sutherland, Wolli Creek, Sydenham and Central. The station has two platforms and electronic indicator boards.

Schools 
Our Lady of Mercy College, a Catholic girls' school catering to years 7 through 10, is located on Dominic Street.

De la Salle Catholic College, Cronulla, a Catholic co-educational school catering to years 11 and 12, is located on Cross St.

Burraneer Bay Public School, a public primary school (kindergarten through year 6), is located on Burraneer Bay Road. It was formally zoned in Woolooware, but has officially been part of the suburb of Burraneer since 2008.

St Francis De Sales Primary School lies on the border of Burraneer and Woolooware.

Bus routes
Transdev NSW provides these bus services in the Burraneer area:-
971 from Cronulla to Hurstville.
988 from Cronulla to Caringbah (4 services a day, weekdays only Cronulla - Caringbah, 2 services a day Caringbah - Cronulla)

Sport and recreation
Burraneer's nearest sporting club is Cronulla Seagulls FC, located in neighbouring Woolooware.
Burraneer Bay Park has an area of bushland, a boardwalk, a playground and a bicycle/jogging track.
There are a number of small park reserves, some of which have children's play equipment. Binaville Ave Reserve and Rutherford Reserve are located at the end of Woolooware Road.
 Lugano Avenue Small Craft Launching Facility, Burraneer Bay. Opened in 2020, the wharf is a small craft launch facility providing safe access for kayakers, rowers and paddlers.
There are a number of publicly accessible wharves, beaches and bay accesses, such as Hospital Bay Wharf, located at the end of Gunnamatta Rd, Bulls Beach, parallel to Bulls Rd, accessed via Lugano Ave, and Bell Place Beach, accessed via pathway between number 5 & 7 Bell Place.

References

Suburbs of Sydney
Sutherland Shire